The Stage is a British weekly newspaper and website covering the entertainment industry and particularly theatre. It was founded in 1880. It contains news, reviews, opinion, features, and recruitment advertising, mainly directed at those who work in theatre and the performing arts.

History
The first edition of The Stage was published (under the title The Stage Directory – a London and Provincial Theatrical Advertiser) on 1 February 1880 at a cost of three old pence for twelve pages. Publication was monthly until 25 March 1881, when the first weekly edition was produced. At the same time, the name was shortened to The Stage and the publication numbering restarted at number 1.

The publication was a joint venture between founding editor Charles Lionel Carson and business manager Maurice Comerford. It operated from offices opposite the Theatre Royal, Drury Lane. Carson, whose real name was Lionel Courtier-Dutton, was cited as the founder. His wife Emily Courtier Dutton later founded several theatrical charities.

The Stage entered a crowded market, with many other theatre titles (including The Era) in circulation. Undercutting their rivals, Carson and Comerford dropped the price of the paper to one penny; soon it became the only remaining title in the field.

The newspaper has remained in family ownership. Upon the death in 1937 of Charles Carson's son Lionel, who had assumed the joint role of managing director and editor, control passed to the Comerford family.

From 1995, the newspaper has awarded The Stage Awards for Acting Excellence at the Edinburgh Festival Fringe.

In 2004, 96-year-old contributor Simon Blumenfeld was recognised by Guinness World Records as the world's oldest weekly newspaper columnist. The column continued until shortly before his death in 2005.

The Stage Awards were launched in 2010. They are given annually and recognise outstanding organisations working in theatre and beyond in the following categories: London theatre, regional theatre, producer, school, fringe theatre, theatre building, unsung hero and international.

In August 2013, The Stage launched The Stage Castings, an online casting service with a video audition function.

In May 2019, The Stage partnered with the Andrew Lloyd Webber Foundation and UK Theatre to launch Get Into Theatre, a website dedicated to theatre careers.

Careers started via The Stage
In 1956, writer John Osborne submitted his script for Look Back in Anger in response to an advertisement by the soon-to-be-relaunched Royal Court Theatre.

Dusty Springfield responded to an advertisement for female singers in 1958.

Idris Elba got his first acting role in a play after applying to a job ad in the paper.

Harold Pinter gained his first job after responding to an advert and Kenneth Branagh landed the lead in The Billy Trilogy, in the BBC Play for Today series, after it was advertised in the paper.

The creation of Internationalist Theatre was first announced in the Stage editorial in April 1981.

Ricky Tomlinson responded to an ad for United Kingdom, another Play for Today, in 1981 and Sandi Toksvig landed her first television job playing the part of Ethel in No. 73 after answering an ad in The Stage.

Television presenter Maggie Philbin won her first major role, as a co-presenter of Multi-Coloured Swap Shop, after answering an advertisement in The Stage.

A number of pop groups have recruited all or some of their members through advertisements placed in the newspaper, most notably the Spice Girls in 1994, Scooch in 1998 and 5ive in 1997. Lee Mead (the actor who won BBC One talent show Any Dream Will Do to gain the lead role in Joseph and the Amazing Technicolor Dreamcoat) got his first professional job, working on a cruise ship, through a recruitment ad in the paper.

Television presenter Ben Shephard auditioned for GMTV children's show Diggit following an advert in The Stage. While he did not get the part, he met Andi Peters, who subsequently hired him for the Channel 4 youth strand T4.

Charles Dance landed his first role in a Welsh theatre and Alexandra Burke stated in an interview "My mum used to buy The Stage all the time for auditions for me. That's how I got to go on [BBC TV talent show] Star for a Night with Jane McDonald."

Olivier Award-winning actor Sharon D. Clarke found her first role at Battersea Arts Centre through an audition advert in the paper.

Lisa Scott-Lee revealed that pop band Steps were formed through an advert in The Stage.

Sir Michael Caine stated in an interview with Steve Wright on BBC Radio 2 that at the beginning of his career he applied for acting roles he found in The Stage.

Editors
 1880–1901 Charles Carson
 1901–1904 Maurice Comerford
 1904–1937 Lionel Carson
 1937–1943 Bernard Weller
 1943–1952 S. R. Littlewood
 1952–1972 Eric Johns
 1972–1992 Peter Hepple
 1992–1994 Jeremy Jehu
 1994–2014 Brian Attwood
 2014–2017 Alistair Smith (print) and Paddy Smith (online)
 2017–present Alistair Smith

The Stage and Television Today
In 1959 The Stage was relaunched as The Stage and Television Today, incorporating a pull-out supplement dedicated to broadcasting news and features. Derek Hoddinott, the main paper's TV editor, became editor of the new supplement.

The name and supplement remained until 1995, when broadcasting coverage was re-incorporated into the main paper. The name on the masthead reverted to The Stage, but in 2006, the paper introduced a blog concentrating on television, named TV Today.

Digital archive
The paper's full content from 1880–2007 is available digitally via subscription.

Quotations
 "The moment you have arrived in the profession is when you realise you don't have to read The Stage" – Noël Coward (attributed)
 "The stage would not be the stage without The Stage" – Laurence Olivier (The Stage, 25 October 1976)

References

External links
 
 The Stage reviews of Internationalist Theatre productions London during the editorship of Peter Hepple

1880 establishments in the United Kingdom
Magazines established in 1880
Theatre in the United Kingdom
Theatre magazines
Weekly magazines published in the United Kingdom
Magazines published in London